Reena Kaushal Dharmshaktu (Hindi: रीना  कौशल धर्मशक्तू) is the first Indian woman to ski from coast of Antarctica to South Pole covering a distance of 900 kilometers .

About
Dharmshaktu was born into a Hindu family from Punjab. She grew up in Darjeeling. She completed mountaineering courses at the Himalayan Mountaineering Institute in Darjeeling. Reena was an instructor with the US-headquartered National Outdoor Leadership Schools (NOLS) that teaches outdoor skills to people. Her husband, Love Raj Singh Dharmshaktu is also a mountaineer, who has reached the summit of Mount Everest seven times.

Expeditions
Dharmashaktu has been on expeditions to Gangotri 1, did the first ascent of Argan Kangri. She also climbed Fluted Peak, Stok Kangri, Mt Nun and others.

On 29 December 2009, Dharmshaktu made the historic ski-run as part of an eight-woman Commonwealth team (the Kaspersky Commonwealth Antarctic Expedition) which crossed a 900 kilometer Antarctic ice trek to reach the South Pole, marking 60th anniversary of the founding of the Commonwealth. She was selected from among 800 applicants and are from Brunei, Cyprus, Ghana, India, Jamaica, Singapore, New Zealand and the UK.

Awards 
Dharmshaktu was awarded the Tenzing Norgay National Adventure Award 2010 in land adventure category.

References

External links
Delhiite is first Indian woman to ski to South Pole
First Indian woman to ski to the South Pole

People from Delhi
Living people
Female polar explorers
Punjabi people
1970s births
Recipients of the Tenzing Norgay National Adventure Award